Shivesh Kumar is former member of the Legislative Assembly in the state of Bihar, India, who was elected in the 2010 Bihar legislative assembly election representing the Agiaon constituency for the Bharatiya Janata Party (BJP).  In the 2015 Bihar Legislative Assembly election he lost the seat to Prabhunath Prasad of the Janata Dal (United).

References

Living people
People from Bihar
Ranchi University alumni
Year of birth missing (living people)
Bihar MLAs 2010–2015
People from Bhojpur district, India
Bharatiya Janata Party politicians from Bihar